Grupo Fundo de Quintal or simply Fundo de Quintal (Backyard Group, roughly) is a Brazilian Samba band formed in Rio de Janeiro at the end of the 1970s.

History
The founding members of Fundo de Quintal, Almir Guineto (banjo/cavaco), Bira Presidente (pandeiro), Jorge Aragão (acoustic guitar), Neoci (tan-tan), Sereno (tan-tan), Sombrinha (acoustic guitar/chip) and Ubirany (hand-repique), used to perform on Wednesdays in the sambas at the headquarters of the carnival block Cacique de Ramos in the mid-1970s. With the introduction of instruments – such as tan-tan, hand-repique and banjo—the group created a completely innovative style in samba (which, later on, the Brazilian music industry called pagode).

Patronized by the famous Samba singer Beth Carvalho, Fundo de Quintal recorded its first album "Samba É No Fundo de Quintal"  in 1980. Shortly thereafter, Almir Guineto and Jorge Aragão left the group to pursue a solo career, in addition to Neoci, who soon died.. Arlindo Cruz (banjo / cavaco) and Walter Sete Cordas (acoustic guitar) joined the band, which recorded its second album  "Samba É No Fundo de Quintal Vol. 2" in 1981. But Walter Sete Cordas left soon after, having been replaced by Cleber Augusto (acoustic guitar). The lineup of Arlindo Cruz, Sombrinha, Cleber Augusto, Sereno, Bira Presidente and Ubirany recorded seven studio albums and one live album between 1983 and 1990.

Following the departure of Sombrinha, Fundo de Quintal recruited Mário Sérgio (cavaco) just as Ademir Batera (drummer) joined the group, having debuted on LP "É Aí Que Quebra a Rocha", released the following year. In 1992, Arlindo Cruz left Fundo de Quintal, which recruited Ronaldinho (banjo). The new lineup of Mário Sérgio, Ronaldinho, Cleber Augusto, Sereno, Bira Presidente and Ubirany recorded eight studio albums and two live albums between 1993 and 2002, the year in which Cleber Augusto left the group for health reasons.

In 2008, it was Mário Sérgio who left the band to pursue a solo career, but he returned five years later. However, he died in 2016, a victim of cancer. Even with the departure of Ronaldinho in 2018, Fundo de Quintal has been active, with two new members Júnior Itaguay (banjo) and Márcio Alexandre (cavaco), in addition to the remaining Ademir Batera, Sereno, Bira Presidente and Ubirany who died in 2020.

Band members

Current members
 Bira Presidentepandeiro, vocals 
 Ubiranyhand-repique, vocals 
 Serenotan-tan, vocals 
 Ademir Bateradrums 
 Júnior Itaguaybanjo, lead vocals 
 Márcio Alexandrecavaco, lead vocals

Former members
 Almir Guinetobanjo, cavaco, vocals 
 Jorge Aragãoacoustic-guitar, vocals 
 Neocytan-tan, vocals 
 Sombrinhacavaco, acoustic-guitar, lead vocals 
 Walter 7 Cordasacoustic-guitar, vocals 
 Arlindo Cruzbanjo, cavaco, lead vocals 
 Cleber Augustoacoustic-guitar, vocals 
 Mário Sérgiocavaco, lead vocals 
 Ronaldinhobanjo, vocals 
 Flavinho Silvacavaco, lead vocals 
 Milsinhocavaco, lead vocals 
 Delcio Luizcavaco, lead vocals

Discography 
Studio albums

 1980: Samba é No Fundo de Quintal
 1981: Samba é No Fundo de Quintal Vol. 2
 1983: Nos Pagodes da Vida
 1984: Seja Sambista Também
 1985: Divina Luz
 1986: O Mapa da Mina
 1987: Do Fundo do Nosso Quintal
 1988: O Show Tem Que Continuar
 1989: Ciranda do Povo
 1991: É Aí Que Quebra a Rocha
 1993: A Batucada dos Nossos Tantãs
 1994: Carta Musicada
 1995: Palco Iluminado
 1996: Nas Ondas do Partido
 1997: Livre Pra Sonhar
 1998: Fundo de Quintal e Convidados
 1999: Chega Pra Sambar
 2001: Papo de Samba
 2003: Festa Pra Comunidade
 2006: Pela Hora
 2011: Nossa Verdade
 2015: Só Felicidade

Live albums

 1990: Ao Vivo
 2000: Simplicidade
 2002: Gravado no Cacique de Ramos
 2004: Ao Vivo Convida
 2007: O Quintal do Samba
 2008: Samba de Todos os Tempos
 2009: Vou Festejar
 2012: No Compasso do Samba
 2015: Fundo de Quintal no No Circo Voador — 40 Anos
 2017: Roda de Samba do Fundo de Quintal no Cacique de Ramos Accolades 
In 2015, their album Só Felicidade'' was nominated for the 16th Latin Grammy Awards in the Best Samba/Pagode Album category.

References

External links
Official site
 

Brazilian musical groups
Musical groups established in 1978
Samba ensembles
Pagode musical groups